Hilda Plowright (29 November 1890 – 9 October 1973) was a British actress.

Biography 
Plowright was born in Swaffham, Norfolk, England. Following a career on the stage in Britain she came to the United States and obtained work and a Social Security number in New York. She died in San Diego, California following a career in film, theatre and television, primarily playing older women in assorted small roles. She had over 50 film and television appearances between 1938 and 1965. She also appeared in at least 13 theatre productions on Broadway between 1925 and 1940.

Theatrical work in Britain
Plowright had an extensive theatrical career in Britain from 1908 to 1921. The 17 August 1916 review from The Cornishman of her in the title role, Ann Annington, of Lechmere Worrall's play "Ann" (later made into the film Her Winning Way) was favourable:

Films

Plowright had a starring role in her first film, the 1938 Hopalong Cassidy B-movie Partners of the Plains where Gwen Gaze was the leading lady.

Plowright's role as a Quaker librarian in The Philadelphia Story has been noted as one of the first examples on film of a librarian saying "shush" to patrons, giving rise to and popularising a "new dimension to the stereotype" of stern, straightlaced librarians in film. She also was cast in Wilson as Jeannette Rankin. She auditioned for, but was not given, the role of Frau Schmidt in The Sound of Music.

Her last film was My Fair Lady in 1964 in which she had a minor role.

Filmography
Plowright appeared in mostly small character roles often uncredited, in dozens of films throughout her career, including the following:

Television
Plowright's television credits included two appearances in Alfred Hitchcock Presents in 1957 and 1959. Other television credits included NBC Matinee Theater (1956) and roles on The Gale Storm Show (1956), The Joseph Cotten Show (1956), and Schlitz Playhouse (1951).

Broadway Theatre credits
Broadway productions where Plowright appeared were:
A Tale of the Wolf (1925)
Saturday Night (1926)
Twelfth Night (1926)
When Crummles Played (1928)
Michael and Mary (1929)
Heat Wave (1931)
The Lady with a Lamp (1931)
The Good Fairy (1932)
The Party's Over (1933)
The Distaff Side (1934)
For Valor (1935)
And Now Good-bye (1937)
Leave Her to Heaven (1940)

References

External links 
 
 

1890 births
1973 deaths
English film actresses
People from Swaffham
20th-century English actresses
English emigrants to the United States